St John's Church, in full the Church of St John the Evangelist, is a Church of England church in the Boreham area in the south-east of the town of Warminster, Wiltshire, England. It was built in 1865 and is a Grade II* listed building.

History and features 

The church was begun in 1865 due to the overcrowding of the parish church of St Denys, and was completed in the same year. The Rev J. E. Phillips, vicar of St Denys', opened a building fund which in less than one year raised £2,700, an amount greater than the building's eventual cost of £1,935.

The church was designed by London architect George Edmund Street in 1864–1865, in Early English style. Given the relatively ordinary-looking exterior, the interior is quite unexpected. The tiling throughout, reredos, low chancel screen wall, font, pulpit, oak choir stalls and free-standing nave benches were completed before 1868. The reredos has a gabled centre with Crucifixion. The stained glass in the chancel was made by Clayton and Bell. The bellcote over the east end of the nave has one bell.

The mosaics and opus sectile murals of scriptural scenes on the wall were designed by Charles Ponting and painted by James Powell and Sons in 1911–1915. These striking turn-of-the-century images are matched by the mosaics of the four archangels on the east wall in the chancel, behind the reredos. A western baptistery was added by Ponting in 1925–1926. The church was recorded as Grade II* listed in 1978.

Parish 
St John's was built as a chapel-of-ease for St Denys' church. In 1956 the area around St John's was added to Bishopstrow parish, and that parish was renamed Bishopstrow and Boreham. A group ministry was established in 1974 to cover this parish, Upton Scudamore and the Warminster churches of St Denys and Christ Church; this continues today as the River Were benefice, although Christ Church is now separate.

References

External links
 

Warminster
Warminster
Warminster
Churches completed in 1865
Gothic Revival church buildings in England
G. E. Street buildings
Warminster